Beyond the Gates is an annual extreme metal festival that takes place every year in August in Bergen, Norway. The main stage is at USF Verftet, a refurbished sardine factory transformed into a venue.

The festival took place after Hole in the Sky, a predecessor extreme metal festival which took place also in Bergen in August, ended. The first edition of the festival took place in 2013.

2020 edition and COVID-19 pandemic 
On 25 April 2020, the festival organization announced  that the 2020 edition of the festival would be cancelled because of the ongoing COVID-19 pandemic.

See also
 Inferno Metal Festival
 Hole in the Sky
 Midgardsblot

References

External links
 www.beyondthegates.no

Heavy metal festivals in Norway
Summer events in Norway